This is a  used in medical terminology, their meanings, and their etymologies. Most of them are combining forms in New Latin and hence international scientific vocabulary. There are a few general rules about how they combine. First, prefixes and suffixes, most of which are derived from ancient Greek or classical Latin, have a droppable -o-. As a general rule, this -o- almost always acts as a joint-stem to connect two consonantal roots (e.g.  +  + -logy = arthrology), but generally, the -o- is dropped when connecting to a vowel-stem (e.g.  + -itis = arthritis, instead of ). Second, medical roots generally go together according to language, i.e., Greek prefixes occur with Greek suffixes and Latin prefixes with Latin suffixes. Although international scientific vocabulary is not stringent about segregating combining forms of different languages, it is advisable when coining new words not to mix different lingual roots.

Prefixes and suffixes
The following is an alphabetical list of medical prefixes and suffixes, along with their meanings, origins, and English examples.

A

B

C

D

E

F

G

H

I

J–K

L

M

N

O

P

Q–R

S

T

U

V

X–Z

English meanings

This section contains lists of different root classification (e.g. body components, quantity, description, etc.). Each list is alphabetized by English meanings, with the corresponding Greek and Latin roots given.

Roots of the body

Roots of bodily concepts

Body parts and substances

Roots of color

Roots of description

Roots of position

Prefixes of quantity or amount

See also

 Glossary of medicine
 Classical compound
 International scientific vocabulary
 List of medical abbreviations
 Medical dictionary
 Medicine
 List of commonly used taxonomic affixes

References

External links
 "Root Words & Prefixes: Quick Reference." LearnThatWord. N.p., n.d. Web. 3 March 2013.

roots
Roots
Word coinage